The April Wine Collection is a compilation album by the Canadian rock band April Wine, released in 1992. This album has the biggest selection of songs on one album by April Wine, and is still in print.

Vol 1 – The Singles 
All tracks written by Myles Goodwyn unless otherwise noted.
 "Fast Train" – 3:20
 "You Could Have Been a Lady" (Errol Brown, Tony Wilson) – 3:20
 "Bad Side of the Moon" (Elton John, Bernie Taupin) – 3:14
 "Drop Your Guns" (D. Henman) – 3:35
 "Lady Run, Lady Hide" (M. Goodwyn, J. Clench) – 2:59
 "I'm on Fire for You Baby" (David Elliott) – 3:26
 "I Wouldn't Want to Lose Your Love" – 3:09
 "Tonite Is a Wonderful Time to Fall in Love" – 3:36
 "Like a Lover, Like a Song" – 5:07
 "The Whole World's Goin' Crazy" – 2:42
 "You Won't Dance With Me" – 3:42
 "Roller" – 3:36
 "Rock n' Roll Is a Vicious Game" – 3:16
 "Say Hello" – 3:00
 "Just Between You and Me" – 3:55
 "Sign of the Gypsy Queen" (Lorence Hud) – 4:16
 "Enough Is Enough" – 4:04
 "This Could Be the Right One" – 4:07
 "Rock Myself to Sleep" (Kimberley Rew, Vince de la Cruz) – 2:56

Vol 2 – The Rock Songs 
 "Anything You Want, You Got It" – 4:44
 "I Like to Rock" – 4:27
 "Before the Dawn" (B. Greenway) – 4:20
 "All Over Town" – 2:58
 "Hot on the Wheels of Love" (M. Goodwyn, S. Lang) – 3:12
 "Tonite" – 4:13
 "Future Tense" – 4:09
 "21st Century Schizoid Man" (R. Fripp, M. Giles, G. Lake, I. McDonald, P. Sinfield) – 6:25
 "Crash and Burn" – 2:36
 "Oowatanite" (J. Clench) – 3:50
 "Don't Push Me Around" – 3:13
 "Get Ready for Love" – 4:13
 "Tellin' Me Lies" – 3:03
 "Blood Money" – 5:23
 "Gimme Love" (M. Goodwyn, Hovaness "Johnny" Hagopian) – 3:58
 "Weeping Widow" (Robert Wright, AKA. Art La King) – 3:53
 "Victim for Your Love" – 4:19

Vol 3 – Vintage Wine 
 "Cum Hear the Band" – 3:52
 "Slow Poke" – 3:45
 "Wings of Love" – 4:52
 "Mama Laye" – 4:17
 "Marjorie" – 3:45
 "Child's Garden" – 4:39
 "Lovin' You" – 3:35
 "It's a Pleasure to See You Again" – 2:47
 "Comin' Right Down on Top of Me" – 4:08
 "What If We Fall in Love" – 4:16
 "Tell Me Why" (John Lennon, Paul McCartney) – 3:15
 "Doin' It Right" (Tom Lavin) – 3:36
 "Sons of the Pioneers" – 5:35
 "Love Has Remembered Me" – 4:07
 "Hold On" – 3:53
 "Electric Jewels" (M. Goodwyn, J. Clench) – 5:58

Vol 4 – Live 
 "Anything You Want" – 4:10
 "I Like to Rock" – 3:59
 "All Over Town" – 3:30
 "Just Between You and Me" – 4:01
 "Enough Is Enough" – 4:05
 "This Could Be the Right One" – 4:51
 "Sign of the Gypsy Queen" (Lorence Hud) – 4:25
 "Like a Lover, Like a Song" – 5:06
 "Comin' Right Down on Top of Me" – 1:10
 "Rock n' Roll Is a Vicious Game" – 4:00
 "Roller" – 4:39
 "Don't Push Me Around" – 6:08
 "You Could Have Been a Lady" (Errol Brown, Tony Wilson) – 3:50
 "(Mama) It's True" (M. Goodwyn, J. Clench) – 5:05
 "Just Like That" (M. Goodwyn, J. Clench) – 6:32

Personnel 
 Myles Goodwyn – lead & background vocals, guitar, keyboards
 Jim Henman – vocals, bass, acoustic guitar
 Jim Clench – vocals, bass
 Steve Lang – bass, background vocals
 Jean Pellerin – bass (on "Rock Myself to Sleep" and "Love Has Remembered Me")
 Ritchie Henman – percussion, keyboards
 Jerry Mercer – drums & percussion, background vocals
 Marty Simon – drums (on "Rock Myself to Sleep" and "Love Has Remembered Me")
 David Henman – guitar, vocals, sitar
 Gary Moffet – guitar, vocals
 Brian Greenway – guitar, vocals, harmonica
 Daniel Barbe – keyboards (on "Rock Myself to Sleep" and "Love Has Remembered Me")

Various producers 
 Bill Hill – producer
 Ralph Murphy – producer
 Doug Morris – producer
 Gene Cornish – producer
 Dino Danelli – producer
 Myles Goodwyn – producer
 Nick Blagona – producer
 Mike Stone – producer
 Lance Quinn – producer
 Eddie Kramer – producer

References 

April Wine albums
1992 greatest hits albums
Albums produced by Eddie Kramer
Albums produced by Mike Stone (record producer)
Albums produced by Myles Goodwyn
Aquarius Records (Canada) compilation albums
Albums produced by Nick Blagona